Johnnie James Wilder Jr. (July 3, 1949 – May 17, 2006) was the co-founder and co-lead vocalist of the R&B/funk group Heatwave, who were popular during the late 1970s with hits such as "Boogie Nights", "Mind Blowing Decisions", "Always and Forever", and "The Groove Line".

Life
He served in the U.S. Army during the Vietnam War era.

On February 24, 1979, a van broadsided Wilder's car, paralyzing him from the neck down and hospitalizing him for a year.

During the 1980s and 1990s, Wilder went on to record other albums with the group, as well as an album with his brother entitled Sound of Soul in 1989. Later he began a solo gospel career, singing a cappella on the albums My Goal and One More Day. The latter album featured a re-recording of the song "All I Am" written by Lynsey de Paul and Susan Sheridan, that was originally recorded for the Heatwave album, Candles. Referring to My Goal and One More Day, he stated "The music that I'm doing is my way of giving thanks to God for being alive".

He died in his sleep on May 13, 2006, at his home in Dayton, Ohio, aged 56, from complications of his paralysis. He is survived by his wife, Rosalyn.

References

External links
 Johnnie Wilder Jr. at Find a Grave

1949 births
2006 deaths
20th-century African-American male singers
21st-century African-American people
Musicians from Dayton, Ohio
American funk singers
20th-century American singers
Heatwave (band) members
20th-century American male singers
United States Army soldiers